The Dallas Chamber Symphony (DCS) is a professional, American chamber orchestra that performs in the Moody Performance Hall in the Dallas, Texas Arts District. Founded in 2011, and led by Artistic Director, Richard McKay; the DCS presented its first season in 2012, and performs most of its concerts in the Moody Performance Hall.

Critics have described the DCS as “extremely adroit”, “fresh” and “innovative.”  The  orchestra has been lauded for its film series, which pairs classic silent films with newly commissioned scores.

Japanese violinist Kazuhiro Takagi is the concertmaster.

Artistic Director and Conductor 

Richard McKay, the DCS’s Artistic Director and Conductor, earned his doctorate in orchestral conducting with Gustav Meier and Markand Thakar at the Peabody Conservatory.  While there, he was Assistant Conductor of the Peabody Conservatory orchestras and operas.

McKay earned a Master of Music degree from The University of Texas at Austin, where he studied with Gerhardt Zimmermann and David Neely.

He has served as Music Director of the University of Texas University Orchestra and has also worked with the Baltimore Symphony Orchestra, the Dallas Symphony Orchestra, and the Charlotte Symphony Orchestra.

Originally trained as a pianist, he earned his Bachelor of Music degree in piano performance.

Performance Venues 
The DCS performs its main concert series in Dallas City Performance Hall, which opened in 2012.  Designed by Skidmore, Owings, and Merrill LLP, with Dallas architecture firm Corgan serving as the Architect of Record, the center is in the heart of the Dallas Arts District.

The Piano Competition is held primarily at Southern Methodist University’s Owen Arts Center.

Dallas International Piano Competition 
The DCS International Piano Competition took place for the first time in Dallas, Texas, from March 14–16, 2013.  The symphony partners with Southern Methodist University’s Meadows School of the Arts and offers its participants master classes, performance opportunities, private lessons and the chance to play with the symphony itself in the spring of 2013.

World premieres 

In November, 2012, the DCS premiered a new film score to the silent-film comedy A Sailor-Made Man, starring Harold Lloyd.  The score was commissioned specifically by the symphony as part of their film series and was composed by Brian Satterwhite.

On February 26, 2013, as part of its film series, the DCS Premiered a new all-strings film score to the silent-film horror classic The Cabinet of Dr. Caligari, starring Conrad Veidt.  As with A Sailor-Made Man, the score was commissioned by the symphony and was composed by Brian Satterwhite.

Educational Partners 

The DCS partners closely with Southern Methodist University’s Meadows School of the Arts for its International Piano Competition.

In 2014, the Dallas Chamber Symphony partnered with the Dallas Independent School District (DISD) for an educational concert performed at City Performance Hall in conjunction with the release of their iPad music curriculum, "The Sights and Sounds of the Symphony," by Barbara Vance and Richard McKay.

References

External links 
 Dallas Chamber Symphony Official
 Dallas Chamber Symphony International Piano Competition
 Sight of Sound Film Competition
 Richard McKay Website
 Southern Methodist University's Meadows Music Program
 Dallas City Performance Hall
 Brian Satterwhite Blog
 Theatre Jones Performance Review-A Sailor-Made Man
 D Magazine Performance Review_A Sailor-Made Man
 Dallas Observer Review
 KERA's "Art & Seek" Behind the Music of the DCS
 KERA's "Art & Seek" Silent Films and Symphonies
 "Dallas Morning News" Scott Cantrell Review - Allesio Bax
 Dallas Observer Review of Cabinet of Dr. Caligari

Musical groups established in 2011
Chamber orchestras
Music of Dallas
Texas classical music
Orchestras based in Texas
2011 establishments in Texas